Ryan Jason Karp (born April 5, 1970) is a former major league pitcher who played for the Philadelphia Phillies in 1995 and 1997.

Baseball career
Out of The University of Miami Karp was drafted by the Houston Astros in the 73rd round of the 1989 amateur player draft.  He did not sign with the team, and played college baseball at the University of Miami.

Karp was drafted in the 9th round of the 1992 amateur draft by the New York Yankees and signed. In 1993, pitching for three different minor league teams (the Greensboro Hornets, the Prince William Cannons, and the Albany-Colonie Yankees), Karp was 16-3 with a 2.11 ERA, and struck out 176 batters in 173 innings.

He was traded February 9, 1994, to the Philadelphia Phillies with Kevin Jordan and Bobby Muñoz for Terry Mulholland and a player to be named later (Jeff Patterson).  He made his major league debut on June 23, 1995; it was the only game he played that season. He spent 1996 in the minor leagues and played in 15 games in 1997 for the Phillies.

In November 1997, he was the 54th overall pick by the Tampa Bay Devil Rays in the 1997 MLB expansion draft. He pitched for the Triple-A Durham Bulls in 1998, and split the 1999 season between the independent Bridgeport Bluefish and the Oklahoma RedHawks and Tulsa Drillers of the Texas Rangers organization.

Post-playing career
Ryan is the Vice President of Global Tax Technology for State Street Corporation.

References

External links

Pelota Binaria
Sports Pool

1970 births
Living people
Baseball players from Los Angeles
Albany-Colonie Yankees players
Bridgeport Bluefish players
Durham Bulls players
FIU Panthers baseball players
Greensboro Hornets players
Los Angeles Harbor Seahawks baseball players
Major League Baseball pitchers
Miami Hurricanes baseball players
Oklahoma RedHawks players
Oneonta Yankees players
Pastora de los Llanos players
American expatriate baseball players in Venezuela
Philadelphia Phillies players
Prince William Cannons players
Reading Phillies players
Scranton/Wilkes-Barre Red Barons players
Tulsa Drillers players
Beverly Hills High School alumni